Steven W. Yates is an American nuclear chemist who is currently a Distinguished Professor at the University of Kentucky and an elected fellow of the International Union of Pure and Applied Chemistry (IUPAC), American Chemical Society, and American Physical Society.

References

Year of birth missing (living people)
Living people
Fellows of the American Physical Society
University of Kentucky faculty
21st-century American physicists